The Estadio Osvaldo Roberto (also known as Parque Osvaldo Roberto) is a football stadium located in Montevideo, Uruguay, in the Sayago neighborhood at the intersection of Ave. Sayago and Ave. Millan streets.  The stadium's capacity is 8,500 people.  It is the home ground of Racing Club de Montevideo.  The stadium was opened in 1941. 

The stadium is named after the founder and a former player of Racing Club de Montevideo, Osvaldo Roberto.

References

Sport in Montevideo
O
Buildings and structures in Montevideo
Racing Club de Montevideo